is a novel by Japanese author Masuji Ibuse. Ibuse began serializing Black Rain in the magazine Shincho in January 1965. The novel is based on historical records of the devastation caused by the atomic bombing of Hiroshima.

Plot

The book alternates between Shizuma Shigematsu's journal entries and other characters from August 6–15, 1945, Hiroshima, and the present. The present time in the novel takes place several years later, when Shigematsu and his wife Shigeko become the guardians of their niece, Yasuko, and thus obligated to find a suitable husband for her. At the start of the novel, three earlier attempts to arrange a match have already failed due to health concerns over her having been exposed to the "Black Rain" – firestorm-generated, soot-filled rain that may also have contained high concentrations of fission products and carbon-14, depending on the precipitation's location and time of onset. The radiation sickness is one of the main causes of concern throughout the story. Shigematsu's journal entries attempt to disprove her sickness, but in the end it turns out that Yasuko was indeed affected by the "Black Rain".

Adaptations
Director Shohei Imamura directed a film adaptation of the Japanese novel in 1989.

See also
 List of books about nuclear issues
 List of films about nuclear issues

References

1965 Japanese novels
Novels about the atomic bombings of Hiroshima and Nagasaki
Novels first published in serial form
Works originally published in Shinchō
Japanese novels adapted into films